The Hellinikon Olympic Complex is a closed, partially demolished sports complex, situated at Hellinikon in the south Athens, approximately 16 kilometres from the Olympic Village. It was built on the site of the former Hellinikon International Airport for the staging of the 2004 Summer Olympics and 2004 Summer Paralympics. It consists of five separate venues.

Venues

Hellinikon Indoor Arena 

The Indoor arena was an arena adjacent to the Fencing Hall. It hosted the Basketball preliminary matches and the Handball finals at the 2004 Summer Olympics in Athens, Greece. The facility seats 15,000 spectators for basketball, although only 10,700 seats were made publicly available during the Olympics - and seats 13,500 fans for handball - though only 10,300 seats were made publicly available during the games. The facility was completed on May 31, 2004 and officially opened on July 30, 2004.

During the 2004 Summer Paralympic Games, the Indoor Arena was the venue for Wheelchair rugby. It has also been the home arena of the Greek basketball club Panionios, and it has also hosted several finals matches of the Greek Cup. The Greek basketball club Panellinios also played European cup home games at the arena.

It was demolished in 2022.

Fencing Hall

Olympic Baseball Centre 

The Olympic Baseball Centre in Athens consists of two Baseball stadiums. It was the site of the Baseball games at the 2004 Summer Olympics in Athens, Greece. The larger stadium seats 8,700 fans-though only 6,700 seats were made publicly available during the Olympics; the smaller stadium seats 4,000 spectators, though only 3,300 seats were made publicly available during the Games. The facility had to be constructed with significant foreign help in the design, as there were only a handful of dusty baseball diamonds in the whole of Greece before the 2004 Olympics were awarded to Athens in 1997. Construction on the facility was completed on February 27, 2004, and it was officially opened on August 12, 2004, a day before the Opening Ceremonies. During the 2004 Summer Paralympic Games, the Olympic Baseball Centre was the venue for Archery.

Olympic Canoe-Kayak Slalom Centre

Olympic Hockey Centre

Olympic Softball Stadium

Post-Olympics Development 
The table below lists the current status and usage of the Hellinikon Olympic Complex facilities. Venues in italics have been demolished.

The site was used to house refugee populations in the current Refugee crisis in Europe. The three camps were home to over three thousand refugees living in mostly tented accommodation.

There are currently works under way to convert much of the former Hellinikon International Airport site to a metropolitan park, that requires demolishing of the complex's venues.

External links
Hellinikon Indoor Arena @ stadia.gr

References

2004 Summer Olympics official report. Volume 2. pp. 269, 291, 318, 353, 395.

 
Venues of the 2004 Summer Olympics
Sports complexes in Greece
Olympic Parks